Élisa is a French drama film directed by Jean Becker and starring Vanessa Paradis, Gérard Depardieu, Clotilde Courau, Firmine Richard and Florence Thomassin. It was released in 1995.

Plot
Marie is a teenage girl living a criminal life with her friends on the streets of Paris. Her mother, Élisa, suffering from poverty, abandoned by her husband and estranged from her parents, had tried to kill her when she was very young and subsequently committed suicide, while her father has never been part of her life. One day she decides to find and take revenge on her father for not helping her when she was a child. When she finds him she realises that she cannot kill her own father, at least not before he has had the chance to explain.

Cast 
Vanessa Paradis as Marie Desmoulin 
Gérard Depardieu as Jacques 'Lébovitch' Desmoulin 
Clotilde Courau as Solange 
Sekkou Sall as Ahmed 
Florence Thomassin as Élisa Desmoulin
Michel Bouquet as Samuel
Philippe Léotard as Gitane Smoker
Catherine Rouvel as Manina  
Melvil Poupaud as Pharmacist's son
Olivier Saladin as Kevin 
Bernard Verley as The contractor
José Garcia as Taxi Passenger
Philippe Duquesne as P.M.U. Owner
Firmine Richard as P.M.U. Customer
Samir Guesmi

References

External links

1995 films
1995 drama films
1990s French-language films
Films directed by Jean Becker
Films scored by Zbigniew Preisner
Films scored by Michel Colombier
Films scored by Serge Gainsbourg
French drama films
1990s French films